Nelly Aronowsky (15 July 1892 – September 1966), known professionally as Nelly Arno, was a German-born British theatre, film and radio actress.

Aronowsky was born in Karlsruhe to Abraham Aronowsky and Fanny (née Maysel). She had a younger brother, Alexander, born in 1896.

In 1920, she was living in Bernburg and already using the stage name Arno. She was appearing on the English stage and radio productions following the Second World War. It's not apparent when she emigrated,  but she became a British citizen in 1948.

She died in Queens, New York in September 1966.

Selected filmography
 Take My Life (1947) - Mrs Rusman 
 Portrait from Life (1948) - Anna Skutetsky
 The Lost People (1949) - Old Woman in Box
 The Third Man (1949) - Kurtz's Mother (uncredited)
 So Long at the Fair (1950) -  Madame Verni
 State Secret (1950) - Barber Shop Manager
 The Last Page (1952) - Miss Rosetti (uncredited)
 Tread Softly (1952)
 Street Corner (1953) - Customer at jewelry store (uncredited)
 The Love Lottery (1954) - The Russian Woman
 A Prize of Gold (1955) - German Landlady
 Three Empty Rooms (1955) - Mrs. Elihu

References

External links

 

1892 births
1966 deaths
Actors from Karlsruhe
20th-century British actresses
20th-century German actresses
Date of death missing
German emigrants to the United Kingdom